Erik Herman Hansen (born 4 June 1945 in Copenhagen, Hovedstaden) is a Danish sailor and Olympic champion.

He won a gold medal in the Soling Class at the 1976 Summer Olympics in Montreal, and again at the 1980 Summer Olympics in Moscow.

References

External links
 
 
 

1945 births
Living people
Danish male sailors (sport)
Olympic sailors of Denmark
Olympic gold medalists for Denmark
Olympic medalists in sailing
Sailors at the 1976 Summer Olympics – Soling
Sailors at the 1980 Summer Olympics – Soling
Medalists at the 1980 Summer Olympics
Medalists at the 1976 Summer Olympics
Sportspeople from Copenhagen